Kātyāyana (कात्यायन) also spelled as Katyayana (est. c. 6th to 3rd century BCE) was a Sanskrit grammarian, mathematician and Vedic priest who lived in ancient India.

Origins
According to some legends, he was born in the Katya lineage originating from Vishwamitra, thus called Katyayana.

The Kathāsaritsāgara mentions Kātyāyana as another name of Vararuci, a re-incarnation of Lord Shiva's gana or follower Pushpadanta. The story also mentions him learning grammar from Shiva's son Kartikeya which is corroborated in the Garuda Purana where Kartikeya (also called Kumara) teaches Katyayana the rules of grammar in a way that it could be understood even by children. It may be that his full name was in fact Vararuci Kātyāyana.

Relation to Goddess Katyayini
In texts like Kalika Purana, it is mentioned that he worshipped Mother Goddess to be born as his daughter hence she came to be known as Katyayani or the "daughter of Katyayan" who is worshipped on the sixth day of Navratri festival. According to the Vamana Purana once the gods had gathered together to discuss the atrocities of the demon Mahishasura and their anger manifested itself in the form of energy rays. The rays crystallized in the hermitage of Kātyāyana Rishi, who gave it proper form therefore she is also called Katyayani.

Works
He is known for two works:
 The Vārttikakāra, an elaboration on Pāṇini grammar. Along with the Mahābhāṣya of Patañjali, this text  became a core part of the Vyākaraṇa (grammar) canon.  This was one of the six Vedangas, and constituted compulsory education for students in the following twelve centuries. 
 He also composed one of the later Śulbasūtras, a series of nine texts on the geometry of altar constructions, dealing with rectangles, right-sided triangles, rhombuses, etc.

Views
Kātyāyana's views on the sentence-meaning connection tended towards naturalism. Kātyāyana believed, that the word-meaning relationship was not a result of human convention. For Kātyāyana, word-meaning relations were siddha, given to us, eternal. Though the object a word is referring to is non-eternal, the substance of its meaning, like a lump of gold used to make different ornaments, remains undistorted, and is therefore permanent.

Realizing that each word represented a categorization, he came up with the following conundrum (following Bimal Krishna Matilal):
"If the 'basis' for the use of the word 'cow' is cowhood (a universal) what would be the 'basis' for the use of the word 'cowhood'?  
Clearly, this leads to infinite regress. Kātyāyana's solution to this was to restrict the universal category to that of the word itself — the basis for the use of any word is to be the very same word-universal itself." 

This view may have been the nucleus of the Sphoṭa doctrine enunciated by Bhartṛhari in the 5th century, in which he elaborates
the word-universal as the superposition of two structures — the meaning-universal or the semantic structure (artha-jāti) 
is superposed on the sound-universal or the phonological structure (śabda-jāti).

In the tradition of scholars like Pingala, Kātyāyana was also interested in mathematics. Here his text on the sulvasutras dealt with geometry, and extended the treatment of the Pythagorean theorem as first presented in 800 BCE by Baudhayana.

Kātyāyana belonged to the Aindra School of Grammar.

Notes

References
 Joseph, George Gheverguese: The Crest of the Peacock: Non-European Roots of Mathematics
 Pingree, David. Jyotihsastra: Astral and Mathematical Literature. Otto Harrassowitz. Wiesbaden, 1981. .

External links

Ancient Sanskrit grammarians
Ancient Indian mathematicians
3rd-century BC people
Indian Sanskrit scholars
2nd-century BC mathematicians
Ancient Indian mathematical works